Jon & Billy is an album by trumpeter Jon Faddis and saxophonist Billy Harper recorded in Japan in 1974 and originally released on the Japanese Trio label.

Reception

On AllMusic Ron Wynn states " the date's value is in hearing where Harper and Faddis, as well as jazz itself, were in the mid-'70s and then comparing how far they and the music have and have not come since then".

Track listing
 "Jon and Billy" (Roland Hanna) – 6:02
 "Water Bridge-Mizu Hashi San" (Ron Bridgewater) – 8:06
 "Ballad for Jon Faddis" (Hanna) – 4:03
 "Two 'D's from Shinjyuku, Dig and Dug" (Billy Harper) – 7:07
 "17-Bar Blues" (Hanna) – 5:29
 "This All" (Hanna) – 7:56

Personnel 
Jon Faddis – trumpet
Billy Harper – tenor saxophone
Roland Hanna – piano, electric piano
George Mraz – bass
Motohiko Hino – drums
Cecil Bridgewater – kalimba (track 4)

References 

1974 albums
Billy Harper albums
Jon Faddis albums